The Women's sprint event of the Biathlon World Championships 2013 was held on February 9, 2013. 115 athletes participated over a course of 7.5 km.

Results
The race was started at 16:15.

References

Women's sprint
2013 in Czech women's sport